Jephthah Comprehensive Secondary School is located in Ozuoba, Port Harcourt, Nigeria.  It was formed by Mrs Ifeoma Chukwuogo on  October 6, 1995.

References

External links
Jephthah Comprehensive Secondary School website

Schools in Port Harcourt
Christian schools in Nigeria
Educational institutions established in 1995
Secondary schools in Rivers State
1995 establishments in Nigeria
1990s establishments in Rivers State